Mary Stewart, Countess of Buchan (1434 or 1435 – 20 March 1465) was the fifth daughter of James I of Scotland and Lady Joan Beaufort. She married Wolfert VI of Borselen, a Zeelander nobleman and lived in the Netherlands until her death in 1465. She had two children who died young.

Family
Mary had five sisters and twin brothers, one of whom died in infancy. Her surviving brother became James II of Scotland. Her sisters married into various European royal dynasties. Her sister Margaret became the dauphine of France, but died childless at age 20, apparently of fever. Her sister Isabella became the duchess of Brittany and had two daughters. Another sister, Eleanor, married a Habsburg archduke and lived in Austria, but died without offspring. Her sister Joan, a deaf-mute, stayed in Scotland and married a Scottish earl, leaving four children, and her youngest sister, Annabella, was twice married and twice divorced and had children with her second husband, a Scottish earl.

Marriage
In 1444, Princess Mary married Wolfert VI van Borselen in Veere, Zeeland, Netherlands. He was the son of Hendrick van Borselen, Count of Grandpré and Jean van Halewyn. The marriage stimulated commercial relations between Scotland and the Low Countries.

The Scottish king granted Mary's husband the title of earl of Buchan, and so Mary became the Countess of Buchan. In 1464, her husband was a Marshal of France, and he was later created Wolfart VI, Lord of Veere and Count of Grandpre.

Mary died on 20 March 1465, 30 to 40 years old, without surviving issue (Their son Charles had died in 1451). She was buried in Sandenburg, ter Veere, Zeeland. After her death, her husband married Charlotte de Bourbon, daughter of Louis I, Count of Montpensier. Their daughter Anna married a grandson of Philip the Good. Wolfart died 1487.

The title of Buchan was eventually conferred, in 1469, on her half-brother James Stewart (her mother's son by her second marriage), who was called the 1st Earl of Buchan.

Ancestry

References 

 thePeerage.com

15th-century births
1465 deaths
Mary
Scottish countesses
Mary Stewart, Countess of Buchan
Medieval Dutch nobility
15th-century Scottish people
15th-century Scottish women
Medieval Dutch women
15th-century women of the Holy Roman Empire
Daughters of kings